The End-of-Text character (ETX) is a control character used to inform the receiving computer that the end of a record has been reached. This may or may not be an indication that all of the data in a record have been received. In ASCII and in EBCDIC, ETX is code point 0x03, often displayed as ).

It is often used as a "break" character (Control-C) to interrupt a program or process. In TOPS-20, it was used to gain the system's attention before logging in.

It is often used in conjunction with Start of Text (STX) and Data Link Escape (DLE), e.g., to distinguish frames in the Data link layer.

mIRC uses ETX as the color character escape character.

See also
 C0 and C1 control codes

Control characters